Alan Partridge is a fictional character portrayed by Steve Coogan. 

Alan Partridge may also refer to:

 Alan Partridge (Brookside), a soap opera character
 Alan Partridge: Alpha Papa, a 2013 comedy film
 Alan Partridge: Welcome to the Places of My Life, a 2012 television serial

See also
 Mid Morning Matters with Alan Partridge, a British television and web series